Mousa Sidi Yaya Dembélé (born 16 July 1987) is a Belgian former professional footballer who played as a central midfielder. He was regarded as one of the best box-to-box midfielders in Europe due to his excellent dribbling skills and ability to maintain possession.

Dembélé started his career at Belgian Pro League team Germinal Beerschot before spells at Eredivisie sides Willem II and AZ in the Netherlands. He won the league title and the Johan Cruyff Shield with the latter in 2009. Dembélé transferred to Premier League side Fulham in 2010 before joining Tottenham Hotspur for a fee of £15 million in August 2012. He was ranked 91st in The Guardians list of the 100 best current footballers in 2012.

Dembélé accumulated 82 caps for the Belgium national team from 2006 to 2018.

Early life
Dembélé was born in Wilrijk, Antwerp, Belgium. His father Yaya is Malian, while his mother, Tilly Huygens, is Belgian of Flemish ethnicity. Dembélé is a Muslim.

Dembélé uses the spelling "Mousa" for his first name (e.g. on his Twitter account), and so do his club, national team and most news articles about him. However, in a 2016 interview, he said that the proper spelling ought to be "Moussa". In a 2018 interview he further clearified that his first name was accidentally misspelled "Mousa" when he had to renew his passport one time and then just decided to keep on using it that way.

Club career

Early career
Dembélé played for K. Berchem Sport as a youth. He started his professional career for Germinal Beerschot, a team in the Belgian Pro League. He made his debut on 24 April 2004 against Charleroi. In 2005, he signed for the youth section of Willem II, despite apparent interest from Eredivisie giants AFC Ajax.

Willem II
Dembélé spent the 2005–06 season in the Eredivisie with Willem II. The team had a very poor season that year, but Dembélé nonetheless scored nine times. After the season, he attracted further interest from the bigger Eredivisie teams and was subsequently transferred to AZ in the summer of 2006.

AZ
In 2006–07, Dembélé was one of the most important players of Louis van Gaal's team. They were poised to win the championship but on the last day lost the title to PSV and only finished third after losing 3–2 to Excelsior. AZ also lost the final of the KNVB Beker against AFC Ajax. Dembélé scored after two minutes played, but AZ lost 8–7 after a penalty shootout, with Dembélé scoring AZ's fifth penalty attempt. AZ further lost the play-off final for qualification to the Champions League, again to Ajax. Dembélé scored six times that season.

The season of 2007–08 was a very disappointing season for AZ. They finished 12th, with Dembélé scoring four times for them. The 2008–09 season started disappointingly as well for Dembélé's team after two defeats, but then AZ started to win more games and eventually won the championship. Dembélé was out injured from October until December with a knee injury, but on his return, he was hailed as being one of the players of the season in the Eredivisie.

Fulham
Dembélé was said to be "edging closer" to join English Premier League club Birmingham City, but on 12 August 2010, Dembélé declined a move to Birmingham in favour of London club Fulham. On 18 August 2010, Fulham announced that Dembélé had joined from AZ on a three-year deal for a fee of £5 million.

Dembélé made an excellent start to his career at Fulham.  He made his début on 22 August 2010, coming on as a substitute against Manchester United. He capped his first start for the club with a goal, scoring the second of six goals against Port Vale in the League Cup on 25 August. The same week, Dembélé made his first league start against Blackpool in which he provided two assists. The first of the two was a cross to Bobby Zamora following a good run in the box, while the second gave Fulham a draw and a point; he dodged past a couple of Blackpool players before playing a good ball for an on-rushing Dickson Etuhu to make the score (and final result) 2–2. Dembélé scored two league goals against Wolverhampton Wanderers on 11 September in a 2–1 win, his first league goals for Fulham. He then scored a great solo goal against Tottenham Hotspur, running from the halfway line before powerfully placing his shot beyond goalkeeper Heurelho Gomes. This was voted the Fulham "Goal of the Season" by the Fulham fans.

It took until 9 May in Fulham's home game against Liverpool for Dembélé to score his third Premier League goal, but the Cottagers were soundly beaten 5–2.

Under manager Martin Jol, Dembélé played in a more creative position in central midfield, either next to club captain Danny Murphy or new signing Mahamadou Diarra. After some very good performances, Martin Jol confirmed the club had opened contract talks with Dembélé in order to fend off interest from other clubs. Dembélé scored two goals in 2011–12 in his new more central role, the first coming as an 86th-minute goal against Wigan Athletic to seal Fulham's 0–2 win at the DW Stadium in late October. His second came right at the business end of the season against Sunderland; his goal was the winner to make the result 2–1, scoring only 30 seconds after Phil Bardsley had equalized to make it 1–1 at Craven Cottage.

Tottenham Hotspur

Dembélé transferred to Tottenham Hotspur on 29 August 2012 after Spurs triggered a £15 million release clause in his Fulham contract.  He scored on his debut against Norwich City on 1 September in a 1–1 home draw. On 21 February 2013, he scored a 90th-minute goal to help Spurs put Olympique Lyonnais out of the UEFA Europa League and qualify for the last 16 of the competition.

On 6 May 2016, Dembélé, despite not having been booked by the referee, was banned for six games by the Football Association for an eye gouge on Chelsea's Diego Costa. The FA stated that "the standard punishment of three matches which would otherwise apply to this offence was clearly insufficient."

Dembélé suffered from a recurring injury to his foot that caused him to miss a number of games in the 2016–17 season. Tottenham's manager Mauricio Pochettino nevertheless described Dembélé as a "genius" in April 2017, and among the best he had worked with, including Diego Maradona and Ronaldinho. Pochettino related that he had said to him: "If we had taken you at 18 or 19 years old, you would have become one of the best players in the world." He underwent surgery on his ankle in May 2017 but thought that he would never be 100% fit again. In the 2017–18 season, he again injured his ankle in the EFL Cup tie against Barnsley in September. However, he gained plaudits for his performances later in the season as a midfielder.

In early November in the 2018–19 season in the match against Wolverhampton Wanderers, he suffered an ankle ligament injury that would see him out of the squad for the rest of the year. This would be his last game for Tottenham as he was transferred in January after six and a half years at the club. In total, he made 250 appearances with 10 goals scored for the club.

Guangzhou R&F/Guangzhou City
In the January 2019 transfer window Tottenham agreed a deal to sell Dembélé to Chinese Super League club Beijing Guoan, but there were complications with the deal. Instead Dembélé was set to move to Guangzhou R&F, also of the Chinese Super League for a reported fee of £11 million. Dembélé joined Guangzhou R&F on 17 January 2019.

On 8 February 2022 Dembélé rejected a contract extension from Guangzhou to spend more time with his family and he retired at the end of the 2022 season.

International career

Dembélé made his first international appearance on 20 May 2006 against Slovakia, coming on as a substitute for Luigi Pieroni. He scored his first international goal in October 2006 against Azerbaijan. Dembélé participated in the 2008 Summer Olympics, where he put on a remarkable show, being instrumental in Belgium's 3–2 win to Italy in the quarter-finals, scoring two goals, including the defining goal of the match. Belgium then progressed, losing to Nigeria in the semi-finals and Brazil in the third place play-offs. Dembélé played in all six of Belgium's games at the Olympics.

On 13 May 2014, Dembélé was named in Belgium's squad for the 2014 FIFA World Cup. He played 65 minutes in midfield before being substituted with Marouane Fellaini in the team's first game of the tournament, a 2–1 win against Algeria in Belo Horizonte.

Dembélé announced his retirement from international football on 7 March 2019, after 82 caps for Belgium.

Style of play
Having begun as a winger and played in that role until 2011, Dembélé primarily played as a central midfielder; he can, however, also operate as an attacking midfielder. He has been described as a footballer who is "big, powerful, technically gifted" and who has excellent "dribbling and passing abilities." His manager at Fulham, Martin Jol, said "Dembélé is probably the best player on the ball I've ever seen." Former midfielder Jermaine Jenas, a teammate of Dembélé's at Tottenham, praised his "passing ability", remarking that the Belgian is "very good technically", while also comparing him to a vacuum cleaner insofar as he "sucks in all the pressure and then releases the ball at the perfect time. If you try to get tight to him, he is strong enough to hold you off and has the ability to look at you and go past you in the blink of an eye. If you drop off him, he is happy too. He can sit deep in front of the back four and dictate the tempo from there".

Dembélé has stated Dutch forward Patrick Kluivert was a childhood hero of his and that his style of play was compared to Kluivert's. At his peak, he was regarded as one of the best players in Europe in his position, due to his dribbling skills and ability to retain possession.

Career statistics

Club

2011–12 appearances includes match in Europa League, away to Dnipro on 25 August 2011, which is currently not included on Soccerbase website.

International
Source:

Source:

Honours
AZ
Eredivisie: 2008–09
Johan Cruyff Shield: 2009

Tottenham Hotspur
Football League Cup runner-up: 2014–15

Belgium
FIFA World Cup third place: 2018

References

External links

Mousa Dembélé at tottenhamhotspur.com

Premier League profile

1987 births
Living people
Belgian people of Malian descent
Belgian sportspeople of African descent
People from Wilrijk
Belgian Muslims
Flemish sportspeople
Footballers from Antwerp
Black Belgian sportspeople
Belgian footballers
Association football midfielders
K. Berchem Sport players
Beerschot A.C. players
Willem II (football club) players
AZ Alkmaar players
Fulham F.C. players
Tottenham Hotspur F.C. players
Guangzhou City F.C. players
Belgian Pro League players
Eredivisie players
Premier League players
Chinese Super League players
Belgium youth international footballers
Olympic footballers of Belgium
Belgium international footballers
Footballers at the 2008 Summer Olympics
2014 FIFA World Cup players
UEFA Euro 2016 players
2018 FIFA World Cup players
Belgian expatriate footballers
Belgian expatriate sportspeople in the Netherlands
Belgian expatriate sportspeople in England
Belgian expatriate sportspeople in China
Expatriate footballers in the Netherlands
Expatriate footballers in England
Expatriate footballers in China